DXTO (103.9 FM), broadcasting as 103.9 Charm Radio, is a radio station owned and operated by the Polytechnic Foundation of Cotabato and Asia. The station's studio is located at Purok Rosal, Brgy. Visayan Village, Tagum.

References

Radio stations in Davao del Norte
Radio stations established in 2001